The Constitution of Guinea-Bissau is the basic law governing Guinea-Bissau. It was adopted in 1984, came into force on 6 May 1984, and revised in 1991, 1993 and 1996.

External links
Constitution of Guinea-Bissau
Constitution of Guinea-Bissau

Guinea-Bissau
Politics of Guinea-Bissau